Pg. 99 (also spelled pageninetynine) was a screamo band from Sterling, Virginia, a town on the outskirts of Washington, D.C. They are considered one of the pioneers of screamo. The band formed as a six-piece in late 1997 and broke up as an eight-piece in 2003; at their maximum capacity they performed with two singers, three guitarists, two bassists and a drummer and were known for their intense live shows.

History

1997-2002: Existence

Pg. 99 toured frequently, performing over 300 shows during its five-year existence. The band underwent a total of nine tours, and have played shows in both the United States and Europe. The band also released three full-length albums, seven splits, an extended play, two compilations, and a demo tape across its lifespan.

In early 1999, Pg. 99 guitarist Mike Taylor and Reactor No. 7 bassist Andy Low founded Robodog Records (now Robotic Empire). The label's first two releases were the Document #3 split 7-inch between Pg. 99 and Reactor No. 7 and the Document #4 tour 6" record that Pg. 99 sold during their first tour in the summer of 1999.

2003-2010: Hiatus
After several US tours, a European tour, and numerous releases, they disbanded in May 2003. Before officially breaking up, Pg.99 booked Steve Albini of Shellac and Big Black as their producer for a follow-up to Document No. 8. Guitarist Mike Taylor cited struggles with maintaining a large line-up due to schedule conflicts, and issues with drinking as major reasons for why Pg. 99 broke up. Taylor also said, "It was like a dysfunctional family where a group of people needed to give each other some space and clarity." Four of the members would go on to perform in Pygmy Lush.

Two releases completed before the group's break up have yet to see light: a DVD compiling various live footage, and a split 10-inch with City of Caterpillar containing both bands' last songs recorded.

2011-present: Reunion shows 
Pg. 99 performed a one-off reunion performance in August 2011. The group performed Document No. 8 in its entirety at the Best Friend's Day festival in Richmond, Virginia. When asked about the future of the band, Taylor said: "We felt that if [Best Friend's Day] went well—how we play, how we sound, how we felt—we'd be up for more. If we're going to do it, it's gotta be right and has to feel good. Community is one of the things that made Pg. 99 gigs so special." After the Best Friend's Day festival sold out, Pg.99 scheduled a second performance on August 27, 2011, at The Black Cat in Washington, DC.

In a group interview with NPR, Pg.99 was asked about the possibility of recording new material, and several of the members gave conflicting responses. Chris Taylor was content writing and releasing new music with Pygmy Lush, and said, "The only reason to realistically do that is being an old fogey and not making any money and being like, 'This could make us some money.'" However, Mike Taylor said he would be interested in "learning some more songs and doing something small."

In 2017, it was announced that the group will reunite again and will tour with Majority Rule in September 2017. Mike Taylor has mentioned plans to release a "long hidden" Document #15 through his Yr Screaming Youth imprint sometime in the future.

Style and influences
Pg. 99 is commonly seen as a screamo band, although the band has expressed some distaste of the label and prefers to be seen as simply punk rock instead. They're also seen as an emoviolence band, sometimes verging on grindcore. The band has also been commonly labeled as hardcore punk. Earlier releases showed the band playing a more straightforward style that's heavily influenced by hardcore punk and grindcore, while later releases showed the band experimenting with progression and atmosphere, such as Document #7.

All of the band's releases were known as "documents", according to the guitarist Mike Taylor, this was done because each release by the band was seen as a document of their state at the time of recording. The band has gone on to name many groups as influences, such as Born Against, Rorschach, Deadguy, Unwound, Jeromes Dream, Leonard Cohen (who is referenced by the band with their song "The Lonesome Waltz of Leonard Cohen"), Orchid, and Sunny Day Real Estate. Artwork for their music was primarily done by vocalist Chris Taylor. Members of the band have been largely involved with the local Virginia scene, with members being in bands such as City of Caterpillar, Enemy Soil, Pygmy Lush, among others.

Members
Line-up
Chris Taylor – vocals (1997–2003, 2011, 2017–present)
Blake "Tiny Dancer" Midgette – vocals (1997–2003, 2011, 2017–present)
Mike Taylor – guitar (1997–2003, 2011, 2017–present)
George Crum – guitar (1997–2001, 2002–2003, 2011, 2017–present)
Jonathan Moore – guitar (2002–2003, 2011, 2017–present)
Cory Stevenson – bass (2000–2002, 2017–present)
Brandon Evans – bass (2000–2003, 2011, 2017–present)
Johnny Ward – drums (1997–2003, 2011, 2017–present)

Former members
T.L. Smoot – bass (1997–2000)
Mike Casto – guitar (1999–2001)
Jeff Kane – programming, noise (1999)
Jonathon Wildman – bass (2001)
Kevin Longendyke – bass (2002–2003)

 Timeline

Discography
Document No. 1 - Demo tape (self-released, 1999)
Document No. 2 - Split 7-inch with Enemy Soil (Sacapuntas Records, 1999)
Document No. 3 - Split 7-inch with Reactor No. 7 (Robodog Records, 1999)
Document No. 4 - Tour 6" (Robodog Records, 1999)
Document No. 5 - First full-length LP/CD (Reptilian Records, 2000)
Document No. 6 - Split 7-inch with Process is Dead (Witching Hour Records, 2000)
Document No. 7 - LP/CD (Magic Bullet Records/Happy Couples Never Last, 2001)
Document No. 8 - LP/CD/Tape (Robotic Empire/Electric Human Project/Scene Police/Old Skool Kids/SzSS, 2001)
Document No. 9: A Split Personality - Split 7-inch with City of Caterpillar (Level Plane Records, 2001)
Document No. 10: Do You Need A Play To Stay? - Split Live LP/CD with Waifle (Magic Bullet Records, 2001)
Document No. 11 - 7-inch Reissue of Documents No. 3 and No. 4 (Robotic Empire, 2002)
Document No. 12 - Split LP/CD with Majority Rule (Magic Bullet Records, 2002)
Document No. 13: Pyramids in Cloth - Split 7-inch with Circle Takes the Square (Perpetual Motion Machine Records, 2002)
Document No. 14: Singles - CD containing all vinyl/compilation/demo tracks (Reptilian Records, 2003) and reissued on vinyl in 2011 through Robotic Empire

References

External links
Official website (archived)
pg. 99 at Reptilian Records
Live recording from August 27, 2011, at The Black Cat via NPR

Punk rock groups from Virginia
American emo musical groups
American screamo musical groups
Hardcore punk groups from Virginia
Powerviolence groups
Musical groups established in 1998
1998 establishments in Virginia
Musical groups disestablished in 2003
2003 disestablishments in Virginia
People from Sterling, Virginia
Level Plane Records artists